The McLaren MCL33 is a Formula One racing car designed and constructed by McLaren to compete in the 2018 FIA Formula One World Championship. The car was driven by two-time World Drivers' Champion Fernando Alonso and Stoffel Vandoorne, with additional testing and development work carried out by reigning European Formula 3 champion Lando Norris and McLaren's regular test driver Oliver Turvey. The MCL33 is the first car built by McLaren to use a customer Renault engine after the team terminated its engine supply deal with Honda after three years and also first McLaren car to utilize a French-licensed engine manufacturer since the Peugeot-powered McLaren MP4/9 in 1994. It made its competitive debut at the 2018 Australian Grand Prix. The car was launched with an orange and blue livery designed as a tribute to some of the team's earliest cars. Currently Fernando Alonso’s MCL33 is on display at the Petersen Automotive Museum in Los Angeles, CA, USA.

After criticising their engine supplier in the previous seasons, a switch to customer Renault engines in 2018 exposed issues with the McLaren chassis. The car could manage just two top 10 qualifying times throughout the season, both by Fernando Alonso, and the team's drivers were eliminated 21 times in the first qualifying session. McLaren had the second worst average qualifying ranking of any team in 2018, only ahead of Williams. Reliability however was improved from the previous year, and the team greatly benefitted from their rivals' problems to score points from the early races. The team finished sixth in the constructors' championship after Force India's points from the first 12 races were excluded. Alonso retired from Formula One at the end of the season, making the MCL33 the last car to date he raced in his Formula One career (until his eventual return to the F1 grid with Alpine in ), while Vandoorne couldn't match his own points tally from 2017 and left the sport.

Design and development

Engine supply
In September 2017, McLaren terminated their full-works partnership with Honda, citing Honda's repeated failure to supply a reliable and competitive power unit as being behind the decision to end the partnership. During negotiations to secure a new supplier, Renault disclosed that they did not have the capacity to supply McLaren whilst meeting their commitments to customer teams Red Bull Racing and Scuderia Toro Rosso. As part of the agreement between Renault and McLaren, Toro Rosso ended their customer relationship with Renault and instead acquired full-works Honda engines, freeing up the existing Renault supply chain for McLaren and allowing Renault to supply the team with their customer 2018-specification engine, the Renault R.E.18 with free engine status.

Engine development
Renault made the first major updates to the R.E.18 power unit at the Canadian Grand Prix. The update introduced in Austria also included a bespoke qualifying mode Renault claimed was focused at maximising performance over a single lap similar to the "party mode" high-performance settings available to Mercedes-powered cars. However, after the same power unit found in the works Renault team car of Nico Hülkenberg failed during the Grand Prix, post race both drivers commented that they did not feel any notable change in power throughout qualifying and felt it gave no significant advantage.

Chassis design
The decision to change from Honda to Renault engines brought with it several challenges for the design team led by McLaren technical director Tim Goss. Where the Honda engine featured the turbocharger mounted to the back of the engine, the compressor at the front and the Motor Generator Unit-Heat positioned in the V shape of the cylinder bank, the Renault R.E.18 engine included all three components attached to the rear of the engine and thus required McLaren to change their design approach. In order to accommodate the R.E.18, McLaren had to redevelop their engine bay, gearbox and the rear suspension geometry. The R.E.18 engine allowed the team more flexibility with the size and position of the fuel cell and allowed the engine to be positioned closer to the driver, however the turbo position on the engine created difficulties as it protruded into the space occupied by the gearbox housing. The team were subsequently required to redesign the gearbox and completely overhaul the rear suspension mounting points in order to fit the engine.

The changes required to accommodate the R.E.18 allowed McLaren to develop a radical design to the rear suspension geometry. The design combined all of the upper elements of the suspension into a single piece, thus minimising the amount of bodywork in a key area of the chassis and in turn reducing drag whilst giving the team a greater degree of control over air flowing over the rear diffuser and producing more aerodynamic grip.

The switch to Renault engines resulted in some problems for the team. During pre-season testing, the MCL33 was observed to have burn marks on the rear of the engine cowling caused by the tight packaging and insufficient cooling for the peak engine temperature. The team introduced a temporary cooling package for the duration of the test ahead of a planned update to the car's bodywork, and later expressed confidence that the engine reliability issues had been resolved.

Mandated changes

Following changes to the sport's technical regulations, the MCL33 features the "halo" cockpit protection device, a wishbone-shaped frame made of titanium that is mounted above and around the driver's head and anchored to the monocoque forward of the cockpit which is designed to improve safety by deflecting debris away from the driver. The final version of the halo weighed several kilograms and forced teams to extensively modify the chassis. Teams reported that the reinforced chassis needed to withstand the equivalent weight of a London bus in order to pass the mandatory crash tests.

The "shark fin", a carbon fibre panel extending backwards from the engine cowling was removed after McLaren lobbied to the FIA to have it written out of the technical regulations. The MCL33 was launched with a carbon fibre fin running perpendicular to the engine cowling from the airbox to the exhaust. The "t-wing", a thin horizontal wing mounted forward of and above the rear wing was also removed after the FIA banned its use for the 2018 championship.

Development history

Early development
Prior to the car's launch, McLaren announced plans for an extensive aerodynamic update to be introduced for the opening round of the championship in Australia. However, the team later admitted that their reliability issues during pre-season testing had forced them to delay the introduction of planned upgrades until the second round in Bahrain. Following the Chinese Grand Prix, team principal Eric Boullier stated that the team's planned schedule of updates meant that the "real" MCL33 would not appear until the Spanish Grand Prix. The team underwent staffing changes ahead of the Azerbaijan Grand Prix, with director of chassis development Tim Goss leaving the team.

Mid-season development
The team introduced its first major update at the Spanish Grand Prix, which featured revised bargeboards and a new front wing. The most substantial changes were focused on the nose, which included grooved channels along the sides, a ducted nose tip and a rearward-facing "cape" designed to funnel air across the car's floor. Commentators noted that the upgrade package integrated concepts originally developed for the Red Bull Racing RB14, Sauber C37 and Force India VJM11. Fernando Alonso praised the upgrades, noting that the car was "much better" than in previous races. However, after difficult races in Canada and France, the team began to suspect that there was a fault in the car's aerodynamics. Unable to find the problem in the windtunnel, they were forced to resort to experimenting with various setups during free practice sessions in an effort to try and find it.

Competition history

Pre-season testing
The MCL33 made its track début at the Circuito de Navarra in Spain where it completed a shakedown before moving to the Circuit de Barcelona-Catalunya for pre-season testing. Fernando Alonso reacted positively after the first day of testing, highlighting the Renault R.E.18 engine was an evolution of the established R.E.17 model. However, the team struggled with several technical problems—including electrical and hydraulic faults—that limited the car's running. McLaren were forced to defend their design when it was suggested that their reliability issues had been triggered by an inherent flaw in the chassis as the Toro Rosso STR13, which used the Honda engines McLaren had abandoned, had run throughout pre-season testing without interruption. At the conclusion of testing, the MCL33 had completed less mileage than any other car—just  compared to the  completed by Mercedes, who completed the most mileage across the eight days of testing—and McLaren admitted that they were underprepared for the season.

Opening rounds

In the week before the Australian Grand Prix, Alonso predicted that the race would be the most difficult of the championship for McLaren. Despite this, he and Vandoorne qualified in eleventh and twelfth place, which became tenth and eleventh following the application of penalties to other drivers. Alonso went on to finish fifth and Vandoorne ninth, scoring a combined total of twelve points. The team acknowledged that circumstances—such as the twin retirements of the Haas cars, both of which had been ahead of the McLarens prior to their retirement—had contributed to the result as much as the MCL33's performance and that there was more to come from the chassis an engine package, but that the result was in line with their expectations for the race.

Alonso and Vandoorne qualified in thirteenth and fourteenth for the next race in Bahrain as the team struggled with a lack of grip. The race saw Alonso and Vandoorne finish in seventh and eighth, scoring another ten points and claiming third place from Red Bull Racing in the World Constructors' Championship standings. Alonso and Vandoorne qualified in thirteenth and fourteenth once more in China, as the team struggled with excess drag, particularly on the circuit's long back straight. Alonso finished the race in seventh courtesy of a late pass on Sebastian Vettel while Vandoorne finished in thirteenth after he made a poor start. Alonso qualified thirteenth in Azerbaijan—which became twelfth after Nico Hülkenberg received a grid penalty—and Vandoorne sixteenth. Alonso was involved in a first-lap incident with Hülkenberg and Sergey Sirotkin that saw his car heavily damaged but went on to finish seventh in a race of attrition. Vandoorne struggled with tyre temperatures in the cool conditions, making several pit stops under the safety car to finish ninth.

Mid-season
Alonso qualified eighth in Spain, marking his first Q3 appearance of the year. Vandoorne missed out on Q3 and ultimately qualified eleventh. Alonso went on to finish the race in eighth place while Vandoorne retired with a gearbox failure. The result saw McLaren lose  fourth place in the World Constructors' Championship to Renault. The Monaco Grand Prix saw the team's first failure to score; Alonso qualified seventh and retired with a gearbox failure, whereas Vandoorne qualified twelfth and finished outside the points in fourteenth. The team struggled in Canada, with Alonso and Vandoorne qualifying in fourteenth and fifteenth respectively. Vandoorne finished the race in sixteenth, while Alonso retired from the second race in a row with a gearbox failure. The team experienced another difficult race in France as both cars were eliminated in the first part of qualifying, which Alonso characterised as a "disaster". Vandoorne finished the race in twelfth, one lap off the lead, while Alonso retired with a suspension failure; he was classified sixteenth overall as he had completed ninety percent of the winner's race distance.

Alonso returned to the points in Austria. He qualified fourteenth but was forced to start from pit lane after the team broke parc fermé rules to replace his front wing. He took advantage of a race of attrition to finish in eighth place. Vandoorne qualified in sixteenth and retired from the race on the penultimate lap with collision damage, but was classified as finishing as he had completed ninety percent of the winner's race distance. Despite their return to the points, McLaren lost fifth place in the World Constructors' Championship to Haas. In the week before the British Grand Prix, Éric Boullier resigned from his position as team principal. His role was split in half, with Andrea Stella becoming Performance Director and Gil de Ferran the Sporting Director. The race saw Alonso and Vandoorne qualify in thirteenth and eighteenth, and finish in eighth and eleventh respectively. The result saw the team slip to seventh in the World Constructors' Championship standings, one point behind Force India.

Complete Formula One results
(key) (results in bold indicate pole position; results in italics indicate fastest lap)

 Driver failed to finish the race, but was classified as they had completed over 90% of the winner's race distance.

Notes

References

External links

MP4-33
2018 Formula One season cars